Egon Franke may refer to:

Egon Franke (politician) (1913–1995), German politician
Egon Franke (fencer) (1935–2022), Polish Olympic fencer